Angel is a London Underground station in the Angel area of the London Borough of Islington. It is on the Bank branch of the Northern line, between King's Cross St. Pancras and Old Street stations, in Travelcard Zone 1. The station was originally built by the City & South London Railway (C&SLR) and opened on 17 November 1901. The station served as a terminus until the line was extended to Euston on 12 May 1907.

The station was rebuilt in 1992 to accommodate the large number of passengers using the station. As a result, it has an extra-wide southbound platform, surfaced over the original island platform which served both north- and south-bound trains. The station has the longest escalators on the Underground network, and the fourth-longest in Western Europe.

It is a candidate station on the proposed Crossrail 2 line from north Surrey and south-west London to south-east Hertfordshire.

Location
On Islington High Street, the station provides access to several nearby Off West End or Fringe theatre venues including the Old Red Lion Theatre, Sadler's Wells Theatre, the King's Head Theatre and the Almeida Theatre. It is the nearest station to City University's main campus, Chapel Market, and the antiques market and dealers of Camden Passage. Between Angel and Old Street is the disused City Road station.

History
Angel station was originally built by the City & South London Railway (C&SLR), and opened on 17 November 1901 as the northern terminus of a new extension from Moorgate. The station building was designed by Sydney Smith and was on the corner of City Road and Torrens Street. On 12 May 1907, the C&SLR opened a further extension from Angel to Euston and Angel became a through station.

As with many of the C&SLR's stations, it was originally built with a single central island platform serving two tracks in a single tunnel – an arrangement still seen at Clapham North and Clapham Common.  Access to the platforms from street level was via three Euston Anderson electric lifts before the rebuilding of the station. When the C&SLR line was closed for tunnel reconstruction in the early 1920s to accommodate larger trains, the station façade was reclad with tiling and the lifts were replaced by new ones from Otis.

Station rebuilding

For years since its opening, the station regularly suffered from overcrowding and had a very narrow island platform (barely  in width), which was considered a major safety issue and caused justified fear among passengers. Consequently, the station was comprehensively rebuilt in the early 1990s. A new section of tunnel was excavated for a new northbound platform, and the southbound platform was rebuilt to occupy the entire width of the original  tunnel, leaving it wider than most deep-level platforms on the system. The lifts and the ground-level building were closed and a new station entrance around the corner in Islington High Street was opened on 10 August 1992, along with the new northbound platform; the enlarged southbound platform opened on 17 September 1992. Because of the distance between the new entrance and the platforms, and their depth, two flights of escalators were required, aligned approximately at a right angle.

The station today

The station's ticket hall has a sculpture of an Angel by Kevin Boys.

Escalators
Angel is one of fourteen stations to have only escalator access to the platforms.

While the video went viral on sites such as YouTube, it was condemned by London Underground, with a press statement issued stating 'this is a dangerous, stupid and irresponsible act that could have resulted in serious injury or death to not only the individual concerned but also other passengers'.

Station improvements 
The station was refurbished during 2007. Additional CCTV cameras and Help Points were installed, bringing the total to 77 cameras in the station and nine Help Points, the latter upgraded with new induction loops to better aid hearing-impaired passengers. In addition, new communications equipment was introduced and damaged signs were replaced with new ones.

Former siding
When Angel was first opened, a long dead-end siding was provided for train stabling, converging from the left onto the northbound line just south of the station. This was retained over the years but eventually it was closed on 23 January 1959 (along with the signal box at the south end of the platform) to simplify through running. The siding lay derelict and unused until the rebuilding scheme. Part of the siding was used as the northbound diversion tunnel, which branched off the existing northbound line, cut through into the end of the siding and continued along it until it branched off left to the new northbound platform.

Services and connections
Train frequencies vary throughout the day, but generally operate every 3–6 minutes between 06:03 and 00:25 in both directions.

London Bus routes 4, 19, 30, 38, 43, 56, 73, 153, 205, 214, 274, 341, 394 and 476, and night routes N19, N38, N41, N73, N205 and N277 serve the station.

Future proposals
Angel is a proposed station on the Crossrail 2 (Chelsea-Hackney line) project, providing an interchange between Crossrail 2 and the Northern Line. Depending on the route constructed, it would be between King's Cross St. Pancras and Dalston Junction or Hackney Central. It was officially safeguarded as part of the route in 2007, although there had been proposals for a route for some time previously and safeguarding had been in place since 1991.

In media
The station's escalators and the southbound platform were featured in the Bollywood hit film Dilwale Dulhania Le Jayenge.

The station (prior to rebuilding) was the subject of a 1989 edition of the 40 Minutes BBC documentary series titled 'Heart of the Angel'.

Manfred Mann's Earth Band named their ninth album, released in 1979, Angel Station, though it is unclear whether there was any connection between the station and the record.

English band UFO's 2012 album Seven Deadly contains a track called Angel Station - which directly references the Angel Tube Station.

Notes and references

Notes

References

Bibliography

External links

Photographic Collection Homepage from London Transport Museum

More photographs of Angel

Northern line stations
Proposed Chelsea-Hackney Line stations
Tube stations in the London Borough of Islington
Former City and South London Railway stations
Railway stations in Great Britain opened in 1901
Islington